Jacek Wilk (born 17 August 1974 in Kocina, Świętokrzyskie Voivodeship) is a Polish barrister, economist and politician. He was the official candidate of the Congress of the New Right party for the office of President of Poland in the 2015 Polish presidential elections after resigning from supporting its quitting member Janusz Korwin-Mikke. In the first round he received 0.46% of votes, which gave him the tenth place among the candidates.

In 2015, he was elected to Sejm, starting from the Kukiz15 lists in the Warsaw I constituency. Later he joined Konfederacja. He was not re-elected in 2019. He was a candidate in the 2019–20 Confederation presidential primary but was eliminated after the third round of voting. He then endorsed Krzysztof Bosak.

References

External links
 Official website

Candidates in the 2015 Polish presidential election
Congress of the New Right politicians
Kukiz'15 politicians
20th-century Polish lawyers
1974 births
Living people
People from Kazimierza County
21st-century Polish lawyers